Sycorax is a genus of moth flies and sand flies in the family Psychodidae. There are at least 40 described species in Sycorax.

Species
These 43 species belong to the genus Sycorax:

 Sycorax africana Tonnoir, 1920 c g
 Sycorax alpina Vaillant, 1978 c g
 Sycorax andicola Young, 1979 c g
 Sycorax assimilis Barretto, 1956 c g
 Sycorax australis Duckhouse, 1965 c g
 Sycorax bahiensis Bravo, 2003 c g
 Sycorax bicornua Krek, 1970 c g
 Sycorax bidentis Santos, Ferreira & Bravo g
 Sycorax caucasica Jezek, 1990 c g
 Sycorax chilensis Tonnoir, 1929 c g
 Sycorax colombiensis Young, 1979 c g
 Sycorax cryptella Satchell, 1950 c g
 Sycorax dispar Satchell, 1950 c g
 Sycorax duckhousi Wagner, 1989 c g
 Sycorax fairchildi Young, 1979 c g
 Sycorax feuerborni Jung, 1954 c g
 Sycorax filipinae Quate, 1965 c g
 Sycorax furca Curler g
 Sycorax goutneri Jezek, 1990 c g
 Sycorax impatiens Satchell, 1950 c g
 Sycorax kalengoensis Wagner, 1979 c g
 Sycorax konopiki Jezek g
 Sycorax longispinosa Bravo, 2007 c g
 Sycorax malayensis Quate, 1962 c g
 Sycorax milleri Satchell, 1950 c g
 Sycorax nipponicus Tokunaga & Komyo, 1955 c g
 Sycorax popovi Jezek, 1990 c g
 Sycorax satchelli Barretto, 1956 c g
 Sycorax silacea Haliday, 1839 c g
 Sycorax similis (Müller, 1927) c g
 Sycorax sinuosa Curler g
 Sycorax slovacus Halgos, 1975 c g
 Sycorax spina Curler g
 Sycorax tomkineana Jezek g
 Sycorax tonnoiri Jung, 1954 c g
 Sycorax tridentata Curler g
 Sycorax trifida Krek, 1970 c g
 Sycorax trispinosa Young, 1979 c g
 Sycorax tuberculata Santos, Bravo & Falqueto g
 Sycorax usambaricus Wagner & Andersen, 2007 c g
 Sycorax utriensis Bejarano, Duque & Velez, 2008 c g
 Sycorax wampukrum Bravo, 2009 c g
 Sycorax webbi Curler g

Data sources: i = ITIS, c = Catalogue of Life, g = GBIF, b = Bugguide.net

References

Further reading

External links

 

Psychodidae
Psychodomorpha genera